The 1914 Paris–Tours was the 11th edition of the Paris–Tours cycle race and was held on 19 April 1914. The race started in Paris and finished in Tours. The race was won by Oscar Egg.

General classification

References

1914 in French sport
1914
April 1914 sports events